Ulrich I of East Frisia, first count of East Frisia (1408 in Norden – 25 or 26 September 1466, in Emden) was a son of the chieftain Enno Edzardisna of Norden and Greetsiel, and Gela of Manslagt.

Biography
His father Enno had inherited Norden's Attena, and had become headling of Norden, leaving Ulrich a large inheritance. Ulrich also received the inheritance of the respected family Cirksena through his mother Gela, daughter of Affo Beninga, headling of Pilsum and Manslagt, and Tiadeka Siartze of Berum. Gela and her cousin Frauwa Cirksena ("Sydzena") were the only heirs of the Cirksenas of Berum. Ulrich's father Enno had used the opportunity to arrange a marriage between his son from his first marriage, Ulrich's stepbrother Edzard, and Frauwe. Ulrich and Edzard took their wives' family name and arms. When Edzard and Frauwa died childless in 1441 from the plague, Ulrich inherited the holdings of the Cirksenas of Berum as well. In 1430, together with his father and eldest stepbrother Edzard, Ulrich concluded the Freiheitsbund der Sieben Ostfrieslande (Freedom-alliance of the seven East Frisian lands).

This alliance was aimed against the ruling Focko Ukena. Edzard, together with his brother Ulrich, managed to put an end to the rule of the Ukena-faction. Ulrich Cirksena also followed an advantageous marriage strategy. His first wife was Folka, only daughter and heir of headling Wibet van Esens. She transferred the lordship Esens to Ulrich in 1440. After Ulrich Cirksena's marriage to Theda, granddaughter of his opponent, in 1455, the majority of the East Frisian lands were united for the first time. Only the lordships of Jever and Friedeburg remained independent. Sibet Attena, a nephew and ally of Ulrich, received the lordships Esens, Stedesdorf and Wittmund, which together formed the Harlingerland. The Harlingerland did remain under the authority of the Cirksena family.

Because Ocko I tom Brok had loaned East Frisia to the Count of Holland in 1381, the status of the ruler of East Frisia was unclear. Ulrich decided to improve his status by turning directly to the emperor. Emperor Frederick III subsequently raised Ulrich to the status of Imperial Count in 1464. The emperor granted Ulrich the imperial county in Norden, Emden, Emisgonien in East Frisia, though in return Ulrich was required to pay a large sum of money to the chancellery of the emperor, who suffered from near-constant financial troubles.

Family
Ulrich and his second wife, Theda, had the following children:
Heba (1457; † 1476), married count Eric I of Schaumburg-Pinneberg,
Gela (1458; † 1497),
Enno I (1460; † 1491),
Edzard I (1462; † 1528),
Uko (1463; † 1507),
Almut (1465; † 1522/23).

1408 births
1466 deaths
People from Norden, Lower Saxony
Counts of East Frisia